NHLPA Hockey '93 is a Sega Genesis and Super Nintendo Entertainment System ice hockey game developed by Park Place Productions and published by Electronic Arts Sports Network. It is the second installment of the NHL series and the first to be released for the Super NES.

Although considered to be the second EA Sports NHL game, the game was not licensed by the NHL; however, it did receive licensing permission from the NHLPA. Because of this, all teams are referred to only by city (the New York Islanders were referred to as "Long Island") with no use of the team name itself. Additionally, no NHL team logos or NHL emblems are seen anywhere in the game.

Gameplay
The game features are a single-game exhibition mode and a playoff mode (single-elimination or best-of-7), wherein the winner collects a trophy similar to the Stanley Cup.
The game includes mostly complete rosters and all 24 teams from the 1991–92 NHL season, including the expansion Tampa Bay Lightning and Ottawa Senators.

The Genesis version also included EEPROM saving, which allowed one to save lines and the ongoing Playoff, rather than use passwords as in the Super NES version.

Reception

Computer Gaming World approved of the game's use of real NHL hockey player names and teams, and concluded that it was "just about as realistic and detailed as one could hope a cartridge game to be ... two red and blistered thumbs up".

In 2001, Game Informer ranked it the 20th best video game ever made. The staff praised the game's depth and strategy.

References

External links

1992 video games
Electronic Arts games
Sega Genesis games
Super Nintendo Entertainment System games
Ice hockey video games set in Canada
Ice hockey video games set in the United States
EA Sports games
Video games set in 1992
Video games set in 1993
Multiplayer and single-player video games
Video games developed in the United States